Ernest Warburton may refer to:
 Ernest Warburton (musicologist)
 Ernest K. Warburton (physicist)
 Ernest K. Warburton (US Air Force)